Agustin Torres (born 17 August 1978) is an alpine skier from Argentina.  He competed for Argentina at the 2010 Winter Olympics.  His best result was a 54th place in the giant slalom.

References

External links
 
 
 

1978 births
Living people
Argentine male alpine skiers
Olympic alpine skiers of Argentina
Alpine skiers at the 2010 Winter Olympics